Sanjay is a 1995 Indian drama film directed by Shahrukh Sultan and produced by Farhan Mirza and Tess Mirza. It stars Ayub Khan and Sakshi Shivanand in lead roles.

Plot

Sanjay Singh (Ayub Khan) lives in a middle-class family. His father, Ranvir (Paresh Rawal), a retired constable; his mother is a housewife; his elder brother, Pratap (Shakti Kapoor), is married and has one son; and his sister is yet to marry. Ranvir's philosophy is to accept bribes and this is what he teaches his constable son. But Pratap prefers to be honest. Sanjay meets with and the falls in love with beautiful Saaxshi (Sakshi Shivanand), who is the daughter of the Deputy Superintendent of Police. Then things go well with the Singh household, Pratap gets promoted to the position of Inspector, and a political leader (Sadashiv Amrapurkar) gives the Singh family a bungalow to live in. The family is all set to enjoy a comfortable life, when Sanjay discovers that all this luxury and comfort has come to them at a price - a price that each of the Singh family will have to pay collectively and individually.

Cast

Ayub Khan as Sanjay Kapoor
Sakshi Shivanand as Saakshi
Shakti Kapoor as Pratap Singh
Sadashiv Amrapurkar as Political Leader
Goga Kapoor as Professor
Jassi Singh as Rana
Paresh Rawal as Ranvir Singh
Mukesh Rishi
Latika Shukla
Brij Gopal

Music

References

External links 

1990s Hindi-language films
1995 films